Gisela Hahn (born Gisela Drenkhan; 13 May 1943) is a German film actress. She has appeared in more than 40 films since 1964. She was born in Briesen.

Selected filmography

 The Merry Wives of Tyrol (1964) - Reni
 In Bed by Eight (1965) - Schülerin
 DM-Killer (1965) - Püppi
 Neues vom Hexer (1965) - Susan Copperfield
 Who Wants to Sleep? (1965)
 Kommissar X – In den Klauen des goldenen Drachen (1966) - Stella
 Spy Today, Die Tomorrow (1967) - Meisje
 Sladky cas Kalimagdory (1968) - Marta
 Revenge (1969) - Milly
 La servante (1970) - Karin
 They Call Me Trinity (1970) - Sarah
 Gradiva (1970)
 Arriva Durango... paga o muori (1971) - Margot
 Tiger Gang (1971) - Jacky Clay 
 Quando gli uomini armarono la clava e... con le donne fecero din don (1971) - Sissi
 Long Live Your Death (1971) - Orlowsky's Wife
 Zambo, il dominatore della foresta (1972) - Grace Woodworth
 César and Rosalie (1972) - Carla
 Incensurato provata disonestà carriera assicurata cercasi (1972) - Moglie di zaccherin
 Emil and the Piglet (1973) - Lärarinnan
 Es knallt - und die Engel singen (1974) - Jennifer Adam
 Commissariato di notturna (1974) - The German Girl
 Julia (1974) - Myriam
 White Fang to the Rescue (1974) - Katie
 Chi ha rubato il tesoro dello scia? (1974)
 Substitute Teacher (1975) - Gym Teacher
 Victory March (1976)
 The Loves and Times of Scaramouche (1976) - Babette
 A Common Sense of Modesty (1976) - Ursula Kerr
 Le seminariste (1976) - Annalisa - the au-pair Girl
 Mister Scarface (1976) - Clara
 Battaglie negli spazi stellari (1978) - Dr. Helen Parker
 Ernesto (1979) - Mother of Ilio and Rachele (uncredited)
 Disco Fieber (1979)
 White Pop Jesus (1980) - Stella Young
 Palermo or Wolfsburg (1980) - Brigittes Mutter
 Contamination (1980) - Perla de la Cruz
 El caníbal (1980) - Jane
 Forest of Love (1981)
 Banana Joe (1982) - Woman in Perfume Advertisement 
  (1982) - Angela

References

External links

1943 births
Living people
People from Wąbrzeźno
People from West Prussia
German film actresses
20th-century German actresses